Shinhan Bank Co., Ltd. is a bank headquartered in Seoul, South Korea. Historically it was the first bank in Korea, established under the name Hanseong Bank in 1897. The bank was reestablished in 1982. It is part of the Shinhan Financial Group, along with Jeju Bank. Chohung Bank merged with Shinhan Bank on April 1, 2006.

Shinhan Bank started as a small enterprise with a capital stock of KRW 25.0 billion, 279 employees, and three branches on July 7, 1982. Today, it has transformed itself into a large bank, boasting total assets of KRW 176.9 trillion, equity capital of KRW 9.7 trillion, 10,741 employees, and 1,026 branches as of 2006. Shinhan Bank is the main subsidiary of Shinhan Financial Group (SFG).

History 
Shinhan Bank is the descendant of Hanseong Bank, the first modern bank in Korea. It was established by Kim Jong-Han in 1897, but began operating around 1900. It was originally located in a small house with only two rooms. One room was for the president, Yi Jae-Won, and the other room was for the staff. The bank operated by borrowing money from Japanese banks at low interest rates and then loaning it out for twice the rate to the Korean market. The Bank was successful because despite lending out money at twice the rate it borrowed it at, the bank's interest rates were still far lower than what could be obtained elsewhere in Korea at that time.

In an anecdotal story the bank's first property to use as collateral on a loan happened to be a donkey. The bank staff were challenged to feed and care for their collateral as the loan was out.

In March 2013, the Financial Services Commission of South Korea said that Shinhan Bank reported that its Internet banking servers had been temporarily blocked. The South Korean government asserted a North Korean link in the March cyberattacks, which has been denied by Pyongyang.

See also 

 List of South Korean companies
 List of banks in South Korea
 Big Four (banking)
 Incheon Shinhan Bank S-Birds

References

External links 
 Official Website

Banks of South Korea
Companies based in Seoul
Banks established in 1897
Mindan
South Korean brands
1897 establishments in Korea